The Fair Work Ombudsman (FWO) (or formally, the Office of the Fair Work Ombudsman), is an independent statutory agency of the Government of Australia that serves as the central point of contact for free advice and information on the Australian national workplace relations system. The Office of the Fair Work Ombudsman also investigates workplace complaints and enforces compliance with national workplace laws.

The FWO, along with the Fair Work Commission (former Fair Work Australia), the national workplace relations tribunal, began operation on 1 July 2009 under the Fair Work Act 2009.

The head of the Office of the Fair Work Ombudsman is the Fair Work Ombudsman, currently Sandra Parker, who reports to the Hon. Tony Burke MP, Minister for Employment and Workplace Relations.

Office holders
The agency is headed by the Fair Work Ombudsman who is appointed by the relevant Minister under the Fair Work Act 2009 for a term up to 5 years. There have been three statutory appointments to that office since the FWO's inception:

There are currently two Deputy Fair Work Ombudsmen. Mark Scully, for Compliance and Enforcement, and Kristen Hannah for Policy and Communication. Michael Campbell is the Chief Operating Officer and Rachel Volzke is Chief Counsel.

Operational activities
 
Office of the Fair Work Ombudsman achieves its functions by:
 offering people accurate and timely information about Australia's workplace relations system
 educating people working in Australia about fair work practices, rights and obligations
 investigating complaints or suspected contraventions of workplace laws, awards and agreements
 litigating to enforce workplace laws and deter people from doing wrong in the community
 building strong and effective relationships with industry, unions and other stakeholders.

The Office of the Fair Work Ombudsman 
The Office of the Fair Work Ombudsman consists of the Fair Work Ombudsman, supporting staff and Fair Work Inspectors who are all focused on serving the needs of everyone covered by the Australian workplace system. The Fair Work Ombudsman have offices in all capital cities and 14 regional locations across Australia.

Functions 
The functions of the Office of the Fair Work Ombudsman, as set out in the Fair Work Act 2009, include:

Education & advice 
The Fair Work Ombudsman offers employers and employees free information and advice on pay, conditions, and workplace rights and obligations under the national workplace relations system.

Audits & Campaigns 
The Fair Work Ombudsman conducts targeted campaigns and audits. Through targeted campaigns, the Ombudsman aims to inform employers in a specific industry of their obligations, and ensure that they understand and comply with Commonwealth workplace laws. Campaigns can be national, state-based or regional.

An audit is where Fair Work Inspectors check an employer's records to make sure they comply with Commonwealth workplace laws. Sometimes, FWO undertakes an audit or a series of audits in response to a complaint or information given by an industry association, a government minister, the media or another source.

Complaints 
Those in the national workplace relations system can make a complaint to FWO regarding underpayment of wages, conditions (such as annual leave), workplace rights and discrimination in the workplace.

Next steps 
The Office of the Fair Work Ombudsman will make a decision about the best course of action to resolve the complaint. FWO might decide:
 that the matter is outside of their jurisdiction and refer you somewhere else
 that there has not been a breach of Commonwealth workplace laws
 that mediation is the best way to resolve the issues
 to conduct a formal investigation
 to conduct an audit.

An investigation looks at employment records and documents to find out the facts of a workplace complaint and to decide if relevant parties have complied with Commonwealth workplace laws.

There are a number of stages to an investigation. However, it will depend on what a Fair Work Inspector finds during the first stages as to whether the latter stages need to happen. The three stages are:
 Assisted Voluntary Resolution (AVR)
 Full investigation and compliance
 Enforcement

Compliance and enforcement 
The Fair Work Ombudsman can inquire into and investigate breaches of the Fair Work Act. Each year priority areas are announced which guide compliance and education work.

References

External links
  Office of the Fair Work Ombudsman website
 Fair Work Commission website
 Australian Building and Construction Commission
 

Commonwealth Government agencies of Australia
Ombudsmen in Australia
2009 establishments in Australia
Regulatory authorities of Australia
Australian labour law